Promyshlennovsky District is an administrative district (raion), one of the nineteen in Kemerovo Oblast, Russia. As a municipal division, it is incorporated as Promyshlennovsky Municipal District. It is located in the west of the oblast. Its administrative center is the urban locality (an urban-type settlement) of Promyshlennaya. Population:  50,125 (2002 Census);  The population of Promyshlennaya accounts for 36.0% of the district's total population.

References

Notes

Sources

Districts of Kemerovo Oblast